
Gmina Hańsk is a rural gmina (administrative district) in Włodawa County, Lublin Voivodeship, in eastern Poland.

Villages
Gmina Hańsk contains the villages and settlements of Bukowski Las, Dubeczno, Hańsk, Hańsk Drugi, Hańsk-Kolonia, Konstantynówka, Kulczyn, Kulczyn-Kolonia, Macoszyn Mały, Osowa, Rudka Łowiecka, Stary Majdan, Szcześniki, Ujazdów, Wojciechów and Żdżarka.

Neighbouring gminas
Gmina Hańsk is bordered by the gminas of Sawin, Stary Brus, Urszulin, Wierzbica, Włodawa, Wola Uhruska and Wyryki.

References
 Polish official population figures 2006

Hansk
Włodawa County